Borhan ol Din (also Romanized as Borhān ol Dīn and Borhān od Dīn) is a village in Badr Rural District, in the Central District of Ravansar County, Kermanshah Province, Iran. At the 2006 census, its population was 249, in 53 families.

References 

Populated places in Ravansar County